Maximiliano Casa (born 18 February 1993) is an Argentine professional footballer who plays as a forward for Club Atlético Güemes.

Career
Casa's first club were Lanús, with whom he didn't make a senior appearance for but did spend a season out on loan with Flandria of Primera B Metropolitana in 2013–14. He played twenty-seven times for the club as they were relegated to Primera C. He left Lanús permanently in 2014 to sign for Torneo Federal B's San Jorge, who he went onto play eight times for. In January 2015, Casa joined Primera B Nacional side Chacarita Juniors. He made his debut for Chacarita on 24 March versus Ferro Carril Oeste prior to scoring his first senior goal three appearances later against Independiente Rivadavia on 27 September.

After seven matches in 2015, Casa featured forty-four times and scored six goals in the following two seasons of 2016 and 2016–17; the latter ended with promotion to the Argentine Primera División. On 10 August 2017, Casa was loaned out to Atlético de Rafaela of Primera B Nacional. His 100th career appearance arrived in February 2018 against Ferro Carril Oeste. On 13 February 2020, Uruguayan Segunda División side Atenas announced the signing of Casa. He wouldn't play competitively due to the COVID-19 pandemic, but did appear in friendlies before returning to his homeland with Central Norte.

Career statistics
.

References

External links

1993 births
Living people
People from Constitución Department
Argentine footballers
Association football forwards
Argentine expatriate footballers
Expatriate footballers in Uruguay
Argentine expatriate sportspeople in Uruguay
Argentine Primera División players
Primera B Metropolitana players
Primera Nacional players
Club Atlético Lanús footballers
Flandria footballers
Chacarita Juniors footballers
Atlético de Rafaela footballers
Atenas de San Carlos players
Central Norte players
Sportspeople from Santa Fe Province